Remember is the first live album from indie rock band The Fiery Furnaces, released on August 19, 2008. The album includes various live performances of songs from their first six studio albums, recorded between 2005 and the tour for their 2007 album, Widow City.  Some longer songs, such as "Blueberry Boat" and "Quay Cur", have multiple cuts in the track from various performances.  Other songs, such as the tracks from the Bitter Tea medley, were recorded live in the recording studio.

Track listing

Disc one
 Intro - 0:41
 Blueberry Boat - 8:27
 Single Again - 3:33
 Two Fat Feet - 2:28
 Don't Dance Her Down - 3:26
 Single Again (Reprise) - 2:03
 Wicker Whatnots - 2:55
 Little Thatched Hut - 4:12
 I'm in No Mood - 2:59
 Black-Hearted Boy - 2:38
 Bitter Tea - 2:47
 Waiting to Know You - 1:34
 Vietnamese Telephone Ministry - 2:46
 Oh Sweet Woods - 2:31
 Borneo - 3:30
 Benton Harbor Blues - 1:41
 Japanese Slippers - 2:23
 Benton Harbor Blues (Reprise) - 1:03
 Whistle Rhapsody - 1:52
 Crystal Clear - 1:39
 Whistle Rhapsody (Reprise) - 1:15
 Teach Me Sweetheart - 3:41
 Evergreen - 1:37
 Bitter Tea (Reprise) - 1:30

Disc two
 Chris Michaels - 6:57
 Quay Cur - 8:17
 My Dog Was Lost But Now He's Found - 2:52
 Spaniolated - 2:01
 Name Game - 2:27
 Birdie Brain - 2:28
 1917 - 3:08
 Slavin' Away (Intro) - 0:18
 Tropical Ice-land - 3:29
 Asthma Attack - 1:44
 Tropical Ice-land (Reprise) - 0:26
 The Wayward Granddaughter - 4:38
 The Garfield El - 1:48
 A Candymaker's Knife in My Handbag - 1:08
 Forty-Eight Twenty-Three Twenty-Second St. - 2:40
 Slavin' Away - 2:58
 Seven Silver Curses - 1:40
 Clear Signal From Cairo - 1:37
 I'm Gonna Run - 2:26
 Here Comes the Summer - 3:15
 Chief Inspector Blancheflower - 2:31
 Automatic Husband - 1:38
 Ex-Guru - 2:34
 Clear Signal From Cairo (Reprise) - 1:39
 Philadelphia Grand Jury - 1:13
 Navy Nurse - 0:59
 Uncle Charlie - 2:17

Additional information
Instead of displaying the full track listing, the album contains only a listing of the six suites:

 Old HK
 Waiting at the Lobby at 665½ Frontage Road
 In a House Once Owned by the Princes of Mataran
 Drinking by the Des Plaines River
 Black Death Bottle
 A Special Commission of Navajo Basketball Coaches and Blonde Ladies

The packaging includes a small paper insert titled "Remember Treasure Hunt" that proposes that the listener write down guesses of the track listing, before and after listening to the album.

Reception

Personnel 
 Matthew Friedberger - Vocals, guitar, keyboards
 Eleanor Friedberger - Vocals, guitar
 Jason Loewenstein - Bass, guitar
 Bob D'Amico - Drums
 Michael Goodman - Percussion

References

External links
 Album review at Crawdaddy!

The Fiery Furnaces albums